Liu Nannan (born June 19, 1983) is a former Chinese tennis player.

Career
Starting in 2001, Nannan has enjoyed considerable success on the ITF circuit, and occasionally qualified for WTA Tour events. Though her success at the WTA level of the game has so far fallen short of the stellar heights achieved by some of her Chinese contemporaries such as Peng Shuai, Li Na, Zheng Jie, Sun Tiantian and Yan Zi, she has come close enough at times for future hope of stronger results to justifiably abide.

In  March 2001, she came through qualifying to win a $25,000 tournament at Hangzhou, defeating Akiko Morigami, Zheng Jie and Rika Fujiwara in the last three rounds. In July, she won a $10,000 tournament at Tianjin, defeating Peng Shuai in the semi-final; and later the same month she was the losing finalist to Li Na in the $25,000 tournament at Guangzhou. She ended the year world-ranked 275.

In January 2002, she won back-to-back $10,000 tournaments in the UK, at Hull and Tipton, but suffered mixed results for the remainder of the year, losing in numerous quarter-finals and semi-finals, and finished it world-ranked slighter lower, at 297.

2003 was a relatively poor year for Liu as a singles player until December, when she reached the quarter-final of a $50,000 tournament at Shenzhen with a clean run of five straight sets wins in qualifying and the main draw, only to cede victory to Zheng Jie by default. Not even this run could stop her year-end ranking from falling outside the Top 400, at 401.

2004 was Liu's most successful year to date as a singles player. She began it by winning a $10,000 tournament at Tampa, Florida, the fifth ITF singles title of her career. In June, she was the losing finalist to Li Na at a $25,000 tournament at Wulanhaote, and losing semi-finalist to Li Na at a $50,000 tournament at Beijing.  In July, she came through qualifying to reach the semi-final at another $50,000 tournament, at Lexington, KY, with wins over Shikha Uberoi, Rika Fujiwara and Aiko Nakamura. In August, she defeated future star Jarmila Gajdošová in the first round of another $50,000 tournament at Louisville, then came through qualifying to the main draw of her first grand-slam tournament, the U.S. Open, only to lose to Paola Suárez. In September, she also qualified for the WTA tournament at Guangzhou, but lost in the first round after a close contest with Kristina Brandi. She ended the year world-ranked 170th, up 231 places year-on-year.

Early in 2005, Liu continued to play some of her best tennis, qualifying for Hobart with wins over Sofia Arvidsson and Maureen Drake (only to lose in the first round to Gisela Dulko) and for the Australian Open with a win over Yuka Yoshida (only to be ousted from the main draw at the first hurdle by Vera Zvonareva). In April, she reached the semi-final of a $75,000 tournament at Dothan, Alabama, losing to Varvara Lepchenko. This brought up her world-ranking to a high point of 145. She was destined to lose her opening match at four of the next five events she entered, the only exception being a $50,000 ITF tournament at Beijing in June, where she reached the semi-final before conceding a walkover to Li Ting. Since losing to Lepchenko once more in the first round of qualifying for Los Angeles, early in August 2005, Liu has not played another singles match. Her world ranking has therefore plummeted to 344th at the time of writing (March 4, 2006).

ITF Circuit finals

Singles (5–4)

Doubles (2-4)

See also
 Tennis in China

External links
 
 

1983 births
Living people
Chinese female tennis players
Universiade medalists in tennis
Universiade bronze medalists for China
Tennis players from Tianjin
Medalists at the 2003 Summer Universiade